The TCU Horned Frogs baseball team represents Texas Christian University in NCAA Division I baseball. The Frogs have competed in the Big 12 Conference since 2013 and previously competed in the Mountain West, Conference USA, Western Athletic Conference and Southwest Conference.  Since February 2003, the Horned Frogs have played their home games at Lupton Stadium, located on the TCU campus in Fort Worth, Texas. The Frogs are led by head coach Kirk Saarloos.

History

The early years
TCU has fielded a baseball team since 1896, before the university found its permanent home in Fort Worth. The Horned Frog baseball team began playing baseball in the Southwest Conference (SWC) when it became a member of the conference in 1923. In their inaugural SWC season, the Frogs finished the year with a 13–11 overall record and a 2–10 conference record.

The Southwest Conference years
In 1933 Dutch Meyer, most noted for his tenure as head coach of the two-time national champion football team, led TCU to its first SWC title with a 9–1 record. The Horned Frogs went on to win 4 more SWC titles in 1956, 1966, 1967 and 1994. The SWC baseball tournament began in 1977, but the Horned Frogs never earned a conference tournament title before the SWC dissolved following the 1996 baseball season.

The wandering years
The dissolution of the SWC in 1996 touched off a period of instability for the Horned Frogs that lasted nearly two decades, during which they made stops in six conferences. Following the dissolution of the SWC, the TCU Horned Frogs first joined the Western Athletic Conference (WAC). During the 1997 and 1998 seasons, TCU competed in the WAC South Division with the New Mexico Lobos, UNLV Rebels, and former SWC member Rice Owls. The Horned Frogs made two appearances in the WAC baseball tournament in the team's five seasons as a member of the WAC. Eight WAC member schools joined with schools from several other conferences to form the new Mountain West Conference (MWC) in 2000. Two seasons later, TCU joined the Houston Cougars, another former SWC member, in entering Conference USA (C-USA) for the 2002 season.

Long time TCU Head Coach Lance Brown, a SWC hall-of-famer as both a TCU player and TCU coach, retired after the 2003 season. Through his career as TCU's skipper, Brown notched a school-record 517 wins. After Brown's departure, TCU would go on to make several more conference moves in the early 2000s and see an emergence of its baseball program as a perennial national power.

TCU's emergence under Jim Schlossnagle
Jim Schlossnagle was hired as TCU's head coach in 2003 and coached his first season at TCU in Spring 2004. His impact was immediate. Former Head Coach Lance Brown had recruited several exceptional classes, which allowed Schlossnagle to coach his first TCU team to the program's first regular season conference championship in a decade, its first conference tournament championship in history, and its first NCAA Tournament appearance since 1994. Under Schlossnagle, conference championships began piling up year after year, in conference after conference. Schlossnagle's Horned Frogs repeated as C-USA regular season and tournament champions in 2005, and once again earned a berth to the NCAA tournament.

Prior to the 2006 season, conference realignment again led TCU to change conferences as eight other C-USA members changed conference homes. The Horned Frogs joined the Mountain West Conference (MWC), where the Frogs competed for seven years (2006–2012).  In each season in the MWC, TCU advanced to the NCAA tournament and won at least a share of the Mountain West regular season title. In those seven years, TCU also won four MWC Tournament championships. During this era, TCU won its first-ever NCAA Regional Championship in 2009, and repeated the feat in 2010 and 2012. In 2009, the Horned Frogs advanced to its first NCAA Super Regional, where the Texas Longhorns eliminated TCU from the Tournament. In 2010, TCU and Texas met again in an NCAA Super Regional, but the Horned Frogs emerged from the rematch—advancing to the College World Series for the first time in school history. TCU compiled a 3–2 record in its first CWS appearance, eventually falling in the national semifinal to UCLA.

In 2011, the MWC Champion Horned Frogs were eliminated from the NCAA tournament in the Fort Worth Regional, but TCU came storming back in 2012 by winning the College Station Regional over host Texas A&M. TCU advanced to the 2012 Los Angeles Super Regional, where they were again eliminated from NCAA Tournament play by the Bruins.

The Big 12 Conference era
After 16 combined seasons wandering through the Western Athletic Conference, Conference USA and Mountain West Conference (and after brief plan to join the Big East Conference), the Horned Frogs rejoined three former SWC rivals, the Baylor Bears, Texas Longhorns, and Texas Tech Red Raiders, as members of the Big 12 Conference. Pre-season expectations for the Horned Frogs were high after the 2012 Super Regional run, but TCU finished their inaugural season in the Big 12 with a 29–28 record. This season marked the first and only time under Jim Schlossnagle that the Horned Frogs failed to make the NCAA tournament and win a conference title.

The Horned Frogs showed tremendous improvement in their second year in the Big 12. TCU finished the 2014 regular season in second place and swept through the 2014 Big 12 tournament, 4–0, to earn the Big 12 Tournament title. This was the first Big 12 championship won by any TCU team since joining the league on July 1, 2012. The late-season surge earned TCU a coveted National Seed for the first time in the program's long history. TCU hosted and won the 2014 Fort Worth NCAA Regional. Then, as a National Seed, TCU earned the right to host its first Super Regional. The 2014 Fort Worth NCAA Super Regional matched the TCU Horned Frogs against the Pepperdine Waves, winners of the 2014 San Luis Obispo NCAA Regional. The Horned Frogs took 2 of 3 in the Super Regional series to advance to the 2014 College World Series in Omaha, Nebraska. In this, their second CWS appearance in program history, TCU notched a 1–2 record after winning its opening games versus Texas Tech, then falling to Virginia and Ole Miss.

In 2015, TCU earned its first Big 12 Regular Season Baseball Championship. The Horned Frogs were the fifth different team in as many years to win the conference title, and their victory marked the ninth time in Big 12 history that the prior year's Tournament champion went on to win the following year's regular season crown. During the regular season, head coach Jim Schlossnagle notched his 200th conference win and 500th total win as TCU's head coach. The Frogs won their second NCAA Regional of the Big 12 era by defeating North Carolina State, and then hosted and defeated Texas A&M in the 2015 Fort Worth Super Regional to advance to the 2015 College World Series. This season marked the 11th season in 12 years that TCU won either a regular season or conference tournament championship, the fifth time in seven years that the Horned Frogs advanced to a Super Regional, and the third time in six years that TCU advanced to the College World Series.

After significant roster turnover due to graduation and the MLB Draft, 2016 was expected to be a rebuilding year for the Horned Frogs, yet TCU won the 2016 Big 12 Tournament and was selected to host and won their third consecutive NCAA Regional. The Frogs advanced to the College Station Super Regional, where they defeated Texas A&M to advance to the College World Series for the third consecutive year.

On June 9, 2021, Schlossnagle was named the head baseball coach of the Texas A&M Aggies, leaving the Horned Frogs.

Attendance
Since Lupton Stadium opened in 2003, annual total and average attendance for TCU baseball has steadily increased from approximately 1,500 fans per game to over 4,000 fans per game. The increase in attendance has coincided with the Horned Frogs’ 2010, 2014, 2015 and 2016 College World Series appearances and the 2010 Lupton Stadium seating expansion.

Total and average attendance at Lupton Stadium has ranked in the top 15 for NCAA home games since TCU's 2011 season. In 2015, TCU and Lupton ranked 8th nationally in total attendance, 10th national in average attendance, and led all private schools in the nation in total and average attendance. 

The record attendance of 7,383 was set in 2015 when TCU hosted Texas A&M in a 3-game NCAA Super Regional, with each game's total attendance exceeding 7,000.

Season-by-season results

People

TCU Baseball All-Americans

Other baseball awards

Source:

Horned Frogs in Major League Baseball

Source:

See also
List of NCAA Division I baseball programs

References

External links